Happy Betty Nicóle Hildegard Jankell (born 16 December 1993) is a Swedish actress.

Personal life

Jankell is the second daughter of Thorsten Flinck and Annika Jankell. She is the younger sister of Felice Jankell, and is of French-Moroccan descent through her paternal grandfather.

Filmography

Film
Den nya människan (2007)
Maskeraden (2009)
Tusen gånger starkare (2010)
IRL (2013)
Ted – För kärlekens skull (2018)

Television
Ett gott parti (2007)
Värsta vännerna (2008)
Anno 1790 (2011)
Portkod 1321 (2012)
Fjällbackamorden (2012)
Crimes of Passion (2013)
Jordskott (2015)
Star vs the Forces of Evil (2015) *Swedish Dub as Star Butterfly
Familjen Rysberg (2015)
Portkod 1525 (2016)
Storm på Lugna gatan (2018)
The Rain (2020)

References
https://www.aftonbladet.se/tagg/happy-jankell

External links

Swedish Film Database

1993 births
Living people
Swedish actresses
Swedish people of French descent
Swedish people of Moroccan descent